Philip Bergen Swing (October 23, 1820 – October 31, 1882) was a United States district judge of the United States District Court for the Southern District of Ohio.

Education and career

Born in Miami Township, Clermont County, Ohio, Swing read law to enter the bar in 1842. He was in private practice in Batavia, Ohio starting in 1842. He was a county prosecutor for Clermont County in 1847.

Federal judicial service

On March 29, 1871, Swing was nominated by President Ulysses S. Grant to a seat on the United States District Court for the Southern District of Ohio vacated by Judge Humphrey H. Leavitt. Swing was confirmed by the United States Senate on March 30, 1871, and received his commission the same day. Swing served in that capacity until his death on October 31, 1882, in Batavia.

References

Sources
 

1820 births
1882 deaths
Judges of the United States District Court for the Southern District of Ohio
United States federal judges appointed by Ulysses S. Grant
19th-century American judges
United States federal judges admitted to the practice of law by reading law
People from Clermont County, Ohio
People from Batavia, Ohio